This list of churches in Gribskov Municipality lists church buildings in Gribskov Municipality, Denmark.

List

See also
 Listed buildings in Gribskov Municipality
 List of churches in Helsingør Municipality
 List of churches in Fredensborg Municipality

References

External links

 Nordens kirker: Nordvestsjælland

 
Gribskov